Saint-Étienne-de-Bolton is a municipality of 800 people, part of the Memphrémagog Regional County Municipality in the Eastern Townships region of Quebec, Canada. It was named after the Roman Catholic parish serving the municipality.

Geography 

Located a few kilometers from Magog further east, bounded to the east by the Missisquoi River North, 50 km southwest of Sherbrooke, the municipality of Saint-Étienne-de-Bolton sits very close to Mont Foster. It is the second smallest municipality in the Memphrémagog RCM.

Demographics

Population
Population trend:

Language
Mother tongue (2021)

Transportation

Railways
Canadian Pacific Railway operates a railway line that passes through Saint-Étienne-de-Bolton.

Highways
Quebec Autoroute 10, Quebec Route 112 and Quebec Route 245 serve Saint-Étienne-de-Bolton.

See also 
 List of municipalities in Quebec

References

External links

Municipalities in Quebec
Incorporated places in Estrie